When in Rome, do as the Romans do (Medieval Latin sī fuerīs Rōmae, Rōmānō vīvitō mōre; sī fuerīs alibī, vīvitō sīcut ibī; often shortened to when in Rome...), or a later version when in Rome, do as the Pope does, is a proverb attributed to Saint Ambrose. The proverb means that it is best to follow the traditions or customs of a place being visited.

Saint Monica and her son, Saint Augustine, discovered that Saturday was observed as a fast day in Rome, where they planned to visit. However, it was not a fast day where they lived in Milan. They consulted Saint Ambrose who said "When I am here (in Milan) I do not fast on Saturday, when in Rome I do fast on Saturday." That reply is said to have brought about the saying "When in Rome, do as the Romans do."

References 

Latin proverbs
Metaphors referring to places